Paul Dean Crow (born August 21, 1972) is former Major League Baseball (MLB) pitcher.

Career
Crow attended Stratford High School in Houston, Texas, and played collegiate baseball at the University of Miami. He was a 10th round selection of the Seattle Mariners in the 1993 MLB Draft.

References

External links

1972 births
Living people
Baseball players from Texas
Detroit Tigers players
San Jacinto Central Ravens baseball players
Major League Baseball pitchers
People from Garland, Texas
Bellingham Mariners players
Appleton Foxes players
Riverside Pilots players
Port City Roosters players
Tacoma Rainiers players
Toledo Mud Hens players
New Orleans Zephyrs players
Miami Hurricanes baseball players